Andrew James Kadoorie McAulay (born 1967/1968) is a Hong Kong businessman, chairman of Kadoorie Farm and Botanic Garden.

Early life
Andrew McAulay is the son of billionaire Ronald McAulay and his wife, Rita, sister of fellow Hong Kong billionaire Sir Michael Kadoorie. He has a bachelor's degree in law from the University of Oxford.

Career
McAulay became chairman of Kadoorie Farm and Botanic Garden in 1999, and a member of the Kadoorie Farm and Botanic Garden Corporation Board upon its formation in January 1995. He is also chairperson of Partnerships for Community Development, a community development organisation working in China.

He sat on the board of CLP Group from 1997 to 2000.

References

1968 births
Living people
Hong Kong businesspeople
Kadoorie family
Alumni of the University of Oxford
Hong Kong people of British descent
Hong Kong people of Iraqi-Jewish descent